Tam Giang may refer to several places in Vietnam, including:

 , a rural commune of Krông Năng District
 Tam Giang, Cà Mau, a rural commune of Năm Căn District
 , a rural commune of Núi Thành District
 , a rural commune of Yên Phong District